MTV is a Canadian English-language discretionary specialty channel owned by Bell Media with the name and branding used under a licensing agreement with Paramount Global. The channel is devoted to talk, lifestyle and documentary programming, and also airs some scripted programming.

The channel launched as Talktv in 2000, but was not as widely available prior to its relaunch in March 2006. Unlike MTV channels in the U.S. and elsewhere, the channel was restricted in its ability to carry music programming until 2015, due to conditions in the channel's licence issued by the Canadian Radio-television and Telecommunications Commission (CRTC). Thus, the channel never used the "Music Television" tagline as its international counterparts did prior to 2010. Instead, MuchMusic had been launched in 1984 as the designated Canadian channel dedicated to mainstream music.

As a former Category A service, MTV was required to be carried on the basic service of all digital cable providers across Canada. The channel was, and still is, typically offered optionally at the discretion of providers.

History

MTV in Canada before 2005

CHUM Limited launched Canadian music channel MuchMusic in 1984, inspired by the success of MTV (which launched three years ago) in the U.S. CRTC genre exclusivity restrictions prevented MTV from either bringing its U.S. channel directly into Canada or launching a homegrown competitor. Instead, MuchMusic would acquire Canadian rights to MTV's programming.

In October 2001, MTV partnered with Craig Media to launch MTV Canada as a digital cable channel. One of the conditions of licence was that a maximum of 10% of the schedule could be devoted to music videos and music programming. In 2003, CHUM filed a complaint with the CRTC alleging that MTV Canada was airing more music videos and music programming than allowed by its licence and had subsequently become competitive with MuchMusic. In Broadcasting Decision 2003-65, the CRTC found that MTV Canada was offering a music-based service rather than a broadly-based teen channel. Furthermore, the Commission found that MTV was broadcasting in excess of 10% music video clips and that MTV was not meeting its commitment to provide educational programming for teens, nor was it providing any programming from independent educational authorities.

Craig was ordered to come into compliance with its broadcasting licence, but after CHUM purchased Craig in 2004, MTV Networks terminated the agreement with Craig as the contract had included a provision to cancel the agreement if there was a change in ownership. MTV Canada was subsequently rebranded as Razer from 2005 to 2008, when the channel was rebranded as MTV2 on August 1.

Meanwhile, Talktv was launched on September 1, 2000, and primarily carried repeats of CTV talk shows. Talktv had been licensed as an analogue channel, allowing cable companies to offer it without requiring a digital converter box, and was one of the last specialty channels to be launched with that status (all specialty channels licensed since 2001 have been specifically limited to digital distribution). However, it was not explicitly required to receive analog carriage either, provided the provider had already launched digital services. Due to this, combined with the channel's late launch and cable systems approaching capacity for analog channels, Talktv was only available on digital programming tiers, aside from a handful of major markets such as Toronto. In 2002, the CRTC had granted the channel the right to charge 7¢ per subscriber when carried on basic cable, whereas it was previously made available to these viewers free of charge; the new charge had been expected to help sustain the channel's live programming.

Relaunch
 

On September 28, 2005, CTV and MTV Networks announced that Talktv would be relaunched as a new Canadian incarnation of MTV, while continuing to maintain its licence requirement of "documentary programming" with over 68% Canadian content. In the September 28 press release, CTV claimed to have applied for a Category 2 licence that would feature music videos, along the lines of the former MTV2 Canada (now Juicebox).

Prior to the relaunch, The Globe and Mail reported that the network would "... be quite different from what most people associate with the original American MTV, which has increasingly moved away from music videos toward reality shows and other original programming," placing a heavy emphasis on "talk and lifestyle shows". In a Canadian Press report, it was stated that while there could not be a Canadian version of the music-oriented Total Request Live, other spin-off programs were not out of the question. Canadian versions of MTV Cribs, Diary and Making the Video have already been produced.

The relaunch occurred on March 21, 2006, at 6:00 p.m. Eastern Time, with the first edition of MTV Live.

Starting in 2013, the channel would begin airing MTV's scripted programming and the MTV Video Music Awards, alongside new episodes of Degrassi: The Next Generation and its in-house produced aftershow, After Degrassi.

In August 2021, the channel began adopting the current logo being used worldwide.

Programming

MTV carries most of the original programming seen on its U.S. counterpart, though the network's scripted programming (Teen Wolf and Awkward., etc.) and the MTV Video Music Awards did not begin airing on the Canadian channel until 2013.

Music-based programming was absent from the channel because the original broadcasting licence issued for Talktv did not allow for any music programming. Moreover, MuchMusic's previous status as Canada's mainstream music channel (and the accompanying genre protection from direct competition) meant that MTV could not have requested a new format enabling it to compete directly with Much in any event. Since mid-2007, Much and its affiliated channels have been under the same ownership, following CTVglobemedia's acquisition of CHUM Limited, making the former rival networks present-day sister channels.

In March 2015, the CRTC announced it would no longer enforce conditions of licence related to programming for most specialty channels other than those primarily airing news or sports. By that point, MTV's schedule had begun to emphasize scripted series reruns during the daytime hours, including Canadian-produced shows to fulfill Canadian content quotas.

MTV also maintains a Canadian-exclusive web brand called "MTV FORA", which is dedicated to beauty, fashion, and lifestyle content.

Notes

Further reading

External links

Analog cable television networks in Canada
Bell Media networks
MTV channels
English-language television stations in Canada
Television channels and stations established in 2000
2000 establishments in Canada